Bandish is a 1955 black and white Indian Hindi-language film The film stars Ashok Kumar, Meena Kumari, Daisy Irani in lead roles. The film was directed by Satyen Bose.

Cast
 Ashok Kumar as Kamal Roy
 Meena Kumari as Usha Sen
 Daisy Irani as Tomato
 Nazir Hussain as Mahendra
 Bipin Gupta as Mr. Roy
 Pratima Devi as Mrs. Roy
 Shammi as Kavita
 Sajjan as Drama director
 Nanda 
 Indira Bansal as Lata

Crew
 Director – Satyen Bose
 Writer – Jyotirmoy Roy , Govind Moonis , Satyen Bose 
 Music – Hemant Kumar
 Lyricist – Prem Dhawan, Raja Mehdi Ali Khan, S. H. Bihari, Ravi Shankar
 Playback Singers – Lata Mangeshkar, Asha Bhosle, Mohammed Rafi, Hemant Kumar
 Cinematographer – Madan Sinha
 Editor – G. G. Mayekar
 Choreographer – Sachin Shanker

Soundtrack
The film had six songs in it. The music of the film was composed by Hemant Kumar.

References

1950s Hindi-language films
Indian black-and-white films